John Black (born 9 May 1940) is a retired British TV director. Among his directing credits include Coronation Street, Play for Today, Crown Court, Doctor Who (the serials The Keeper of Traken, and Four to Doomsday plus the spinoff K-9 and Company) and The Bill.

References

External links

Living people
British television directors
1940 births